Gish or Great Gish (Kamkata-vari: Giṣ/Gaviṣ, Kati: Giwīṣ, Gyīṣ, Waigali: Giwiš, Prasun: Gīṣ) was the most popular god of Nuristani mythology and received the greatest amount of attention among the Siah-Posh Nuristani of Bashgul. Every village of Bashgul had one or more shrines dedicated to him. In the Nuristani pantheon, Gish ranked next to Moni who was said to be the chief prophet of Imra. Both Moni and Gish were created by Imra by his breath.

Gish was the war-god. Countless bulls and billy goats were sacrificed each year to him and the drums were beaten in his honor for fifteen continuous days, every spring, by the Nuristani slaves.

Etymology
According to Richard Strand, in his Nuristâni Etymological Lexicon, it is related to the Sanskrit word gavíṣ/gaviṣá "desire for cows; eager", an epithet of Indra (with which he is functionally equivalent), in turn from Proto-Indo-Iranian *gawHíšHs, with a later shift in meaning to "war".

Cognates of Kamkata-vari giṣ/gaviṣ include Ashkun gavīṣ and Waigali geṣ. The presence of a retroflex ṣ indicates that the name was borrowed from Sanskrit.

Mythology 
Giwish was born of his mother who was pregnant with him for eighteen months before breaking out of her navel. According to Čanlū of Urtsun, Gish/Giz's mothers was Outhiz (also known as Utr). Imra had ordered the unwed Outhiz to be pregnant. While Outhiz was pregnant with Giz, they would have conversations with each other, and when Outhiz was eighteen months pregnant she asked Giz to come out and be born but Giz refused. Then Outhiz planted a walnut tree with eighteen branches that grew as tall as the sky. She told Giz to come out and see this magnificent tree, hearing which Giz burst out of his mothers navel. Sitting in a chair, he sewed her stomach back up with a steel needle and used a medicine to regenerate her. Outhiz now seeing that the walnut tree's branches had bent over, used iron pillars to hold them up. The tree eventually produced 720 maunds of walnuts, which along with other foods Giz used to feed his army. Once the army was fed, they attacked Sami. During the war, Giz struck his spear to a rock to transform it into a mountain, blocking the enemy from chasing them. When they reached the Bashgal river, Giz told his army to sacrifice a hornless bull, upon which a bridge appeared. When the exhausted army reached a plain, Giz struck his spear into the ground, causing sweet roots to grow. Eventually Sami and his followers will killed and his wealth plundered. After the way, Giz became known as "Laymoch". One day he went to Parun and bellowed like a bullock, he then bellowed at a pasture in Poroidur, and finally on Atser ridge. Since then he was never seen amonst the people.

Ibbetson records that some say Gish's earthly name was Yazid. He also mentions that Gish is stated to have killed Ali, Hasan and Husain and nearly every famous Muslim known to the Kāfirs.

Gish's consort was Sanjü, daughter of the god Sanu. Sanu was a Muslim who tried to convert the Kafirs to Islam, but was killed by Gish who proceeded to play polo with his head.

In popular culture
In John Updike's 1965 short story "God Speaks" (collected in "Museums and Women") Gish Imra is the name of one of the protagonists, the son of the assassinated leader of a Central Asian state called Nuristan.

See also
Indra
Susanoo-no-Mikoto

References

External links
 

Asian gods
Indo-European deities
War gods